The 1916 Sheffield Hallam by-election was a parliamentary by-election held for the House of Commons constituency of Sheffield Hallam in the West Riding of Yorkshire on 23 December 1916.

Vacancy
The by-election was caused by the elevation to the peerage of the sitting Unionist MP, Charles Wortley. Wortley's ascent to the House of Lords was to enable a seat in the Commons to be found for H A L Fisher. Fisher was an historian and noted expert on education. From 1913-1917 he served as Vice Chancellor of the University of Sheffield. The prime minister David Lloyd George wanted Fisher to serve in his cabinet as President of the Board of Education.

Candidates
Lloyd George's government was a Coalition with the Conservatives and despite Fisher being a Liberal, Lloyd George's Unionist allies were willing to lend the Sheffield Hallam seat to him for the sake of the formation of the government and because of his close connection with the city of Sheffield.

The result
There being no other candidates putting themselves forward Fisher was returned unopposed, a technical Liberal gain from the Conservatives.

See also
List of United Kingdom by-elections 
United Kingdom by-election records

References

1916 elections in the United Kingdom
By-elections to the Parliament of the United Kingdom in Sheffield constituencies
Unopposed by-elections to the Parliament of the United Kingdom in English constituencies
1916 in England
1910s in Yorkshire
December 1916 events